James R. Hurley (born January 29, 1932 in Seaford, Delaware) is an American Republican Party politician from Millville in Cumberland County, New Jersey.

Hurley served on Cumberland County's first Board of Chosen Freeholders. He was later elected a member of the New Jersey General Assembly, where he represented the 1st Legislative District from 1968 to 1982 and served as both Minority Leader and Majority Leader. In 1982 he was elevated to the New Jersey Senate where he served for a time as Minority Leader.

On January 2, 1990, Hurley stepped down from the Senate, after he was appointed as a member of the New Jersey Casino Control Commission by Governor Thomas Kean. He was reappointed in 1992 by Governor James Florio and in 1997 by Governor Christine Todd Whitman. On October 29, 1998, he was appointed as the Commission's fifth Chairman and served in that capacity until 2002.

In 1976, Hurley made an unsuccessful run for the House of Representatives in  against William J. Hughes, who had unseated the Republican incumbent in the previous election of 1974. However, Hughes defended his seat and convincingly won the election with 62% of the vote to Hurley's 38%.

As a state senator in August 1983, Hurley received a reprimand from a legislative ethics panel for accepting a $10,000 fee in a land deal between Wawa, Inc. and the state.

Outside politics Hurley worked in public relations and advertising. He created the non-profit Affordable Homes of Millville Ecumenical (AHOME) and served on its board of directors. In December 2010, Hurley was named AHOME's first Chairman Emeritus. The James R. Hurley Industrial Park in Millville is named for him.

References

External links
Archived Casino Control Commission biography

1932 births
Living people
People from Millville, New Jersey
People from Seaford, Delaware
American Presbyterians
Politicians from Cumberland County, New Jersey
Republican Party members of the New Jersey General Assembly
Republican Party New Jersey state senators
Members of American gaming commissions